The Canadian Pacific Navigation Company was an early steamship company that operated steamships on the coast of British Columbia and the Inside Passage of southeast Alaska.  The company was founded in 1883 by John Irving (1854-1936), a prominent steamboat man, businessman, and politician of early British Columbia.  In 1901 the company was purchased by the Canadian Pacific Railway, becoming the steamship division of the CPR.

Ships
The company owned a variety of vessels, including the sternwheeler Princess Louise, R.P. Rithet, the old sidewheelers Wilson G. Hunt and Yosemite, and the coastal steamer Willapa.

Loss of SS Islander
Another ship owned by the company was the steamship Islander, which went down in August 1901. Islander was a steel twin-screw steamer built for the Inside passage to Alaska and favoured by wealthy travelers. On the morning of August 15, 1901, the ship struck a submerged iceberg and went down off the south end of Douglas Island, British Columbia. 40 passengers and crew were lost, including the wife and daughter of the politician James Hamilton Ross.

References

 Hacking, Norman R., and Lamb, W. Kaye, The Princess Story -- A Century and A Half of West Coast Shipping, Mitchell Press, Vancouver BC 1974
 Newell, Gordon, R., ed. H.W. McCurdy Maritime History of the Pacific Northwest, Superior Publishing 1966.
 Turner, Robert D., Pacific Princesses – An Illustrated History of Canadian Pacific Railway's Princess Fleet on the Pacific Northwest Coast, Sono Nis Press, Victoria, B.C., 1977 
 Wright, E.W., Lewis & Dryden's Marine history of the Pacific Northwest, Lewis & Dryden Printing Co., Portland, OR (1995)

Transport in British Columbia
History of British Columbia
Interior of British Columbia
Defunct shipping companies of Canada